Steve Edward Nelson (November 24, 1907 – November 13, 1981) was an American songwriter.

Born in New York City, Nelson worked for Tin Pan Alley starting there in 1929. He later wrote country songs for artists such as Eddy Arnold and Guy Lombardo. In 1950, probably his best known composition, "Frosty the Snowman" was released, co-written with Jack Rollins. In 1952, Nelson co-wrote, again with Rollins, the song which was used for the safety campaign of Smokey Bear.

References

External links
 

1907 births
1981 deaths
Songwriters from New York (state)
20th-century American musicians